Hector Appuhamy is a Sri Lankan politician and a member of the Parliament of Sri Lanka. He was elected from Puttalam District in 2015. He is a Member of the United National Party.

References

Living people
Members of the 15th Parliament of Sri Lanka
Members of the 16th Parliament of Sri Lanka
Samagi Jana Balawegaya politicians
Year of birth missing (living people)